The Shriners Hospital for Crippled Children, also known as Old Shriners Children's Hospital, was a historic building in Portland, Oregon, United States, built in 1923. It was designed in Colonial Revival style with aspects of the Georgian Revival style subtype.  It was listed on the National Register of Historic Places in 1989, and removed in 2011, after being deconstructed in 2004. The hospital now known as Shriners Children's Portland moved to Marquam Hill in 1983, and the old site remained vacant until 2005 when it was demolished and an affordable living apartment complex, Columbia Knoll, was built on the site.

See also
 Shriners Hospitals for Children
 Old Scottish Rite Hospital building

References

1923 establishments in Oregon
Hospital buildings completed in 1923
Hospitals in Portland, Oregon
Colonial Revival architecture in Oregon
Defunct hospitals in Oregon
Former National Register of Historic Places in Portland, Oregon
Demolished buildings and structures in Portland, Oregon
2004 disestablishments in Oregon
Northeast Portland, Oregon
Buildings and structures demolished in 2004
Portland
Masonic buildings completed in 1923
Masonic buildings in Oregon